The Zhejiang University of Technology is a public research university in Hangzhou, Zhejiang, China. It is considered one of the top industrial universities in mainland China and the second largest university in Zhejiang Province after the more comprehensive Zhejiang University.

Engineering, especially chemical and biological engineering, are its strongest disciplines. During the 1980s it made an effort to become a comprehensive technological university instead of a technological college. It keeps a close and broad relationship to the industry.

It is a typical technical university of the new generation in China. It followed the trend during the 1980s and 1990s of Chinese technical institutes changing from the Soviet specialized style into a much more comprehensive style.

History

Although the history of the Zhejiang University of Technology can be traced back to 1910, its independence (establishment) as a college was in 1953 as the school claims officially. It became a comprehensive technical university in 1993.

The institute has had different names throughout its history:
Parts of the National Zhejiang University, (1910~1949)
Hangzhou Chemical Engineering College (1953~)
Zhejiang Chemical Engineering College (1960~1980)
Zhejiang Engineering College (1980~1993)
Zhejiang University of Technology (1993~now)

Schools that joined the Zhejiang University of Technology:
Zhejiang Academy of Economics and Management attached to Zhejiang Provincial Planning and Economic Commission, November 1994
 Hangzhou Industrial Engineering School of Shipbuilding attached to China State Shipbuilding Corporation (CSSC), July 1997
Zhejiang Industrial Engineering School of Building Materials attached to Zhejiang Provincial Building Material Corporation, March 2001

Campuses
 
In Hangzhou, Zhejiang Province:
Urban
Chaohui Campus (or Zhaohui Campus), the headquarters
Suburban
Pingfeng Campus
Zhijiang Campus
Liuxia Campus, for adult education and continuing education
Xiasha Campus (former campus of shipbuilding)

In Quzhou, Zhejiang Province:
Suburban
Zhexi Campus serves the Quzhou Chemical Engineering Group (one of the biggest national chemical enterprises).
Quzhou College

Rankings 
In 2021, Academic Ranking of World Universities ranked Zhejiang University of Technology within the 501-600 band globally.

Colleges and departments

 The College of Chemical Engineering and Materials Science
 The College of Mechanical Engineering
 The College of Information Engineering
 The College of Business and Administration
 The College of Civil Engineering and Architecture
 The College of Biological Engineering and Environmental Engineering
 The College of Humanities
 The College of Pharmaceutical Science
 The College of Science
 The College of Law
 The College of Foreign Languages
 The College of Art
 The College of Jianxing
 The College of Politics and Public Administration
 Zhijiang College
 The College of Adult Education
 International College
 The College of Educational Science and Technology
 The College of Vocational and Technical Education
 The College of Software Engineering
 Software Vocational College
 The Department of Physical Education and Military Training

Key laboratories

National Key Laboratories
National Key Laboratory of Industrial Control Technology
National Key Laboratory and Developing Field of Green Chemosynthetic Technology
Provincial Key Laboratories, at least 7

School-owned corporations

Hangzhou Gongxin Photoelectron Ltd.
Well Information Technology Ltd.
Rongda Corp.
Donghui Technology Co., Ltd.
Yonghong Education & Research Development Co., Ltd.
Enma Co., Ltd.
Bluehouse Electronics Co., Ltd.
Xiangyuan Hotel

People
Notable alumni:
 Xu Guangxian, chemist
 Zhang Zhixiang, Chinese steel magnate
 Zhou Guangyao, Academician of Chinese Academy of Engineering
 Zheng Yuguo, Academician of Chinese Academy of Sciences

Presidents:
Li Shouheng, founder of Chinese chemical engineering, former dean of Zhejiang University 
Li Enliang: civil engineer
Shen Yinchu, academician of Chinese Academy of Engineering, "father of Chinese new generation pesticide" 
Zhang Libin, roboticist

See also
 League of Key Universities in Chang Jiang Delta
 Along with Zhejiang University in Hangzhou, Shanghai Jiaotong University in Shanghai, Southeast University in Nanjing, Fudan University in Shanghai, a student exchange program is held every year between these six key universities.

References

External links

Zhejiang University of Technology website
English language version
Jing Hong Network Union
 Campus real three-dimensional map

 
1953 establishments in China
Educational institutions established in 1953
Engineering universities and colleges in China
Universities and colleges in Hangzhou
Technical universities and colleges in China